Luis Mosquera may refer to:

 Luis Mosquera (footballer, born 1959), Chilean footballer
 Luis Mosquera (footballer, born 1964), Ecuadorian footballer
 Luis Fernando Mosquera (born 1986), Colombian footballer
 Luis Javier Mosquera (born 1995), Colombian weightlifter